Ashina Tuizi (693-700) — was a claimant Qaghan of Western Turkic Khaganate following invasion of Tang dynasty.

Life 
He escaped Tang after execution of his father at the hand of Lai Junchen. After arriving in Tibetan Empire in 693, he claimed Onoq Khaganate with regnal title Tong Yabgu Khagan. He was soon joined by his uncles Ashina Babu (阿史那拔布) and Ashina Poluo (阿史那仆罗).

In 694, combined forces of khagan and Tibetan general Gar Tsenyen Gungton ("Bolun Zanren" (勃論贊刃) in Chinese) suffered a defeat near Qinghai Lake against Wang Xiaojie. Later that year Tridu Songtsen and Tuizi attacked Lengchen and raided several cities. 

According to the Old Tibetan Annals, he was sent to Tujue in 700. Some think he was sent as a reinforcement for Axiji Baolu (阿悉吉薄露), who was thought to be of Western Turk origin and who raised a rebellion against the Tang. Some think he was sent to the Second Turkic Qaghanate as a messenger of the united front with the Tibetan Empire.

In 705, he again allied with Tibetan Empire and conquered Fergana Valley. In 706, Tang army was driven off.

References 

7th-century Turkic people
Ashina house of the Turkic Empire
Göktürk khagans